Friedrich Johannes Frommann (9 August 1797, Züllichau - 6 June 1886, Jena) was a German publisher, bookseller and politician.

Biography 
His father was the bookseller and publisher, Carl Friedrich Ernst Frommann. He attended secondary school in Gotha and served an apprenticeship as a typesetter there. From 1816 to 1817, he attended lectures in history at the University of Jena, and was one of the participants of the Wartburg Festival in Eisenach, about which he later wrote a chronicle. After that, he continued his apprenticeship as a printer and studied in Berlin. There, in 1818, he became one of the founders of the local Burschenschaft (fraternity).

From 1819 to 1820, he was the society's Gymnastics Supervisor.

In 1823, his father took him into the publishing business and he officially became a partner in 1825. After his father's retirement in 1830, he took over the company. Most of the works he published were by Professors at the University of Jena.

He was also a member of the Jena City Council for many years. In 1875, the city of Jena made him an Honorary Citizen and the University awarded him an Honorary Doctorate.

Shortly after his death, his company moved from Jena to Stuttgart. It still exists there today, doing business under the name .

References

Further reading 
 Ingrid Dietsch: Friedrich Johannes Frommann (1797–1886) und der deutsche Buchhandel, Sax Verlag, 2015 
 Helge Dvorak: Biographisches Lexikon der Deutschen Burschenschaft. Vol. I: "Politiker, Supplement A–K". Winter, Heidelberg 2013, pp. 343–345.

External links

 
 Das Burschenfest auf der Wartburg am 18ten und 19ten October 1817. Jena 1818. (Archive)


1797 births
1886 deaths
German publishers (people)
German booksellers
University of Jena alumni
German politicians
People from Sulechów